Santa Catarina Cuixtla is a town and municipality in Oaxaca in south-western Mexico.
It is part of the Miahuatlán District in the south of the Sierra Sur Region. The municipality covers an area of 26.37 km².

As of 2010, the municipality had a total population of 1,496.

References

Municipalities of Oaxaca